Patricia 'Pat' Gillian Willmer is an entomologist and ecologist in the UK.  She is emeritus professor of zoology at the University of St Andrews and is an expert in pollination.

Career and research 
Willmer was initially a neurobiologist at the University of Cambridge, before moving into invertebrate physiology and eventually insect plant interactions.

She has researched pollination biology for over 30 years and she supports agricultural environmental schemes such as wildflower strips to support pollinating insects and enhance crop pollination.

Some of her interesting findings include flowers can change colour such as the legume Desmodium setigerum which changes from lilac to white to turquoise after being visited by a pollinating bee; and acacia plants that manipulate the ants that defend them, releasing a compound mimicking the ant alarm pheromone when they flower so that pollinating insects such as bees can visit.

Selected works

 Bees, ants and wasps: a key to genera of the British Aculeates, published by the Field Studies Council in 1985.
 Invertebrate Relationships: Patterns in Animal Evolution, published by Cambridge University Press in 1990.
 Environmental Physiology of Animals, with Graham Stone and Ian Johnston, published by Wiley Blackwell in 2000.
 Pollination and Floral Ecology, published by Princeton University Press in 2011.

References

External links 

 University of St Andrews profile
 Willmer group website

Living people
Year of birth missing (living people)
British ecologists
British entomologists
Women entomologists
Women ecologists
Alumni of the University of Cambridge
Academics of the University of St Andrews
20th-century British scientists
20th-century British women scientists
21st-century British scientists
21st-century British women scientists